Franz Blizenec (born 30 October 1966) is an Austrian former footballer.

References

1966 births
Living people
Association football midfielders
Austrian footballers
Austrian Football Bundesliga players
SK Rapid Wien players
Grazer AK players
First Vienna FC players